Margot Sanger-Katz is an American journalist, currently working for the New York Times, where she covers health policy. Prior to joining the Times, she worked for National Journal and the Concord Monitor. She has also worked at Yale Alumni Magazine as a senior staff editor, and at Legal Affairs as an associate editor.

Education
Sanger-Katz received her bachelor's degree cum laude from Yale University in 2002, and received her master's degree from the Columbia University Graduate School of Journalism the following year.

Fellowships
In December 2009, Sanger-Katz completed the Medical Evidence Boot Camp at the Knight Science Journalism Fellowship. In 2014, while on leave from the National Journal, she completed a Knight-Bagehot Fellowship in economics and business journalism at Columbia University.

References

External links 

Living people
Year of birth missing (living people)
The New York Times people
American medical journalists
American women journalists
Knight-Bagehot Fellows
Yale University alumni
Columbia University Graduate School of Journalism alumni
21st-century American women